Nine Lives is a 2016 English-language comedy film directed by Barry Sonnenfeld, written by Gwyn Lurie, Matt R. Allen, Caleb Wilson, Dan Antoniazzi and Ben Shiffrin, and starring Kevin Spacey, Jennifer Garner, Robbie Amell, Cheryl Hines, Malina Weissman and Christopher Walken. It is an international co-production between France and China. The plot follows a workaholic father who has his mind trapped inside his daughter's new cat. The film was released by EuropaCorp on 5 August 2016 and grossed $57 million. The film has received negative reviews from critics, who called it unoriginal and unfunny.

Plot
Tom Brand is a major business tycoon in New York City whose workaholic attitude ruined his first marriage with Madison, and his adult son David now works for him and strives for his approval. He now lives with his second wife Lara, who is a little more tolerant of the fact that he is never at home, and his daughter Rebecca and son David. His eponymous company FireBrand is nearing completion on its greatest achievement to date: the tallest skyscraper in the northern hemisphere that will be the new headquarters. In the opening scene, he skydives out of a plane and lands on the top of the new skyscraper, while David his oldest child, who is his assistant, remains in the plane, refusing to jump.

Rebecca's 11th birthday was coming and she has always wanted a cat, but Tom has always refused as he hates cats. Not wanting to disappoint her, he rushes to get a last-minute present for his daughter's birthday, but as he is distracted, the GPS redirects him to a mysterious pet store called Purrkins Pet Shop, brimming with odd and exotic cats. The store's eccentric owner Felix Perkins tells him he does not pick the cat, the cat picks him. The tomcat that picks him is called Mr. Fuzzypants, who, Perkins says, has used up seven of his nine lives. Tom buys the cat.

On his way home for the party, Tom meets with Ian Cox, one of the top managers of the company in charge of the new building, and learns that another building in Chicago will be taller. They have an argument while on the roof that ends with Tom firing Ian, but lightning strikes the antenna. Tom is blown off the building along with the cat, and without any effort from Ian to save him, he plummets off the side of the skyscraper, but his leg gets snagged on some stray equipment and gets flung back inside through a window as he passes out. When he wakes up, he realizes that his human body is in the hospital in a state of coma, and his consciousness is trapped inside the cat's body.

Tom is visited by Felix, who is able to talk to him and knows what happened. Felix warns Tom to reevaluate his priorities, connect with his family, and avoid past mistakes within one week or else remain as a cat forever. When Lara and Rebecca take Mr. Fuzzypants home, he acts in an odd and stubborn way to try to convince his wife and daughter that he is actually Tom. This only drives them mad and he slowly comes to see how much he has ignored his family. He suspects that Lara is cheating on him with model Josh Myers and they had been looking at houses together as a prelude to divorcing him. This motivates him to try to make her happy. He also learns that Ian is trying to make the company public with the help of the board of directors to take power from Tom, even though David is trying to stop him. Ian fires David from the company and plans to announce that the company will be sold at the party for the new tower opening.

Eventually, Rebecca realizes that Mr. Fuzzypants is really her father. Meanwhile, Tom's body is in crisis at the hospital and Lara, David, and Rebecca all go there. Rebecca has the cat hidden in her backpack. In a moment alone, David apologizes to Tom for failing to save the company and takes Tom's ID badge, implying he will commit suicide at the tower. At the hospital, Lara and Dr. Cole plan for Lara to sign a DNR, which is a legal form, indicating that if Tom's heart stops beating, they won't save him. Rebecca calls to the cat to come prove he is really Tom, but Tom remembers what Felix said about love being sacrifice and decides to save David instead, sacrificing his only chance at regaining his humanity.

At the tower, David jumps off the building and the cat jumps after him pulling a cable. It is then revealed that David is wearing a BASE jumping parachute. He lands in the middle of the party, presents the articles of incorporation of the company, and announces that he now controls his father's 51% of the stock. He says the company will remain a family company and fires Ian. Although the cat is not seen landing, Tom wakes up from his coma just in time to see David's announcement on the television. Meanwhile, Ian passes Felix who tells him to hang up his cell phone. Ian ignores him, but is then hit by a car, and his consciousness transfers into a cat that Felix takes back to his shop.

Tom and Rebecca return to Felix where Tom asks if he has any dogs. Felix says he does not, but presents Mr. Fuzzypants, who has one life left.

Cast
 Kevin Spacey as Tom Brand, a tycoon and owner of FireBrand who ends up in the body of a cat named Mr. Fuzzypants.
 Jennifer Garner as Lara Brand, Tom's second wife, Rebecca's mother, and David's stepmother.
 Robbie Amell as David Brand, the son of Tom and Madison, the older half-brother of Rebecca and Nicole, (although he spends more time with Rebecca) and the stepson of Lara who works at FireBrand.
 Cheryl Hines as Madison Camden, the former wife of Tom and the mother of David and Nicole.
 Mark Consuelos as Ian Cox, the top manager at FireBrand who schemes to take control of the company.
 Malina Weissman as Rebecca Brand, the daughter of Tom and Lara and the paternal half-sister of David.

 Christopher Walken as Felix Perkins, the magician and owner of an exotic pet store.

 Teddy Sears as Josh Myers
 Jay Patterson as Benson

 Talitha Bateman as Nicole Camden the daughter of Madison and the maternal half-sister of David Brand.
 Jewelle Blackman as Doctor Cole
 Serge Houde as Stein, a board member
 Mark Camacho as Josh Boone

Production
On 12 January 2015, it was announced Barry Sonnenfeld would direct the film. On 28 January 2015, Kevin Spacey joined the cast. On 25 March 2015, Malina Weissman joined the cast. On 31 March 2015, Christopher Walken joined the cast to play Felix Perkins, the owner of a mystical pet shop, and on 9 April 2015, Jennifer Garner and Robbie Amell joined as well. On 13 April 2015, Mark Consuelos was cast in the film, and on 27 April 2015, Talitha Bateman was cast as well. Principal photography began on 4 May 2015, and ended on 24 July 2015. Filming took place in Montreal.

Release
The film was originally scheduled to be released on 29 April 2016, by EuropaCorp, but was pushed back to 5 August 2016.

Box office
Nine Lives grossed $19.7 million in North America and $38.1 million in other territories for a worldwide total of $57.8 million against a budget of $30 million.

The film was released in North America on 5 August 2016 alongside Suicide Squad. The film was projected to gross $10 million from 2,264 theaters in its opening weekend. The film made $2.4 million on its first day. It went on to gross $6.2 million in its opening weekend, finishing 6th at the box office.

Reception
On Rotten Tomatoes, a review aggregator, the film holds an approval rating of 14% based on 72 reviews, with an average rating of 3.2/10. The site's critical consensus reads, "Not meow, not ever." On Metacritic, the film has a weighted average score of 11 out of 100, based on 16 critics, indicating "overwhelming dislike". Audiences polled by CinemaScore gave the film an average grade of "B+" on an A+ to F scale.

IndieWires David Ehrlich gave the film a grade of D, saying the film was “less funny than the average cat gif and approximately 1,000 times as long... Cats may have nine lives, but you only get one, and it’s too precious to waste on this drivel. You’re better off watching a gif of a cat whose face is stuck in a slice of bread. It will save you $20 and a few hours of your time". David Palmer of The Reel Deal gave the film 3/10, writing, "The only reason this 'comedy' won't derail Kevin Spacey's career is no one will ever watch this outside of military interrogation rooms". Rolling Stones Peter Travers gave the film zero out of four stars and wrote, "At 87 torturous, laugh-free minutes, the film could change the most avid cat fancier into a kitty hater".<ref>{{cite magazine |url=https://www.rollingstone.com/movies/reviews/nine-lives-movie-review-w432920 |title=Nine Lives' Review: Kevin Spacey's Talking Cat Movie Is Pure Kitty Litter |first=Peter|last=Travers|magazine=Rolling Stone|access-date=5 August 2016}}</ref>

Home media
The film was released on DVD and Blu-ray on 1 November 2016, by 20th Century Fox Home Entertainment in the United States. It was released on DVD and Blu-ray in Australia on 7 December 2016, by Madman Entertainment under the alternate title Mr. Fuzzypants''.

References

External links
 
 
 
 

2016 films
2010s fantasy comedy films
Body swapping in films
Chinese fantasy comedy films
Films about cats
Films about families
Films directed by Barry Sonnenfeld
Films set in New York City
Films shot in Montreal
Films shot in New York City
French fantasy comedy films
English-language French films
English-language Chinese films
EuropaCorp films
2016 comedy films
2010s English-language films
2010s French films